Pontevedra is a city located in Merlo Partido, Buenos Aires Province, Argentina. The town was named after the homonymous city of Pontevedra, Spain.

Pontevedra was founded in 1871 by real estate promoters, in the estates belonging to the Irish landlord Thomas Gahan, member of Merlo's first municipal government in 1865.

Pontevedra is a small town surrounded by small truck farms, connected to Merlo, Libertad and González Catán .

The city is bordered by Parque San Martín and Libertad (north), Mariano Acosta (west), González Catán (east) and Veinte de Junio (south), both in La Matanza Partido, and Marcos Paz (south).

External links

 City of Pontevedra

Merlo Partido
Populated places in Buenos Aires Province
Populated places established in 1871
1871 establishments in Argentina
Cities in Argentina